James Thom may refer to:

James Thom (sculptor) (1802–1850), Scottish sculptor
James Alexander Thom (born 1933), American writer
J. C. Thom (1835–1898), American painter, son of sculptor James Thom
Norman Thom (James Norman Thom, 1899–1987), Australian politician